The Association of Accountancy Bodies in West Africa (ABWA) is a regional organization of the International Federation of Accountants (IFAC). As of 2011 there were ten West African accounting institutes represented in ABWA.

History

The association was established on 10 August 1982 in Lagos, Nigeria, and was registered as a corporation in 1994. ABWA was initially collocated with the Institute of Chartered Accountants of Nigeria (lCAN) in Lagos. In May 2002 the association's headquarters moved to the ICAN building in Abuja.
The purpose of the Association is to develop accountancy in the region.
Recognized non-governmental accountancy bodies in West African countries are encouraged to join the association.

Activities

ABWA initiated the Accounting Technicians Scheme, West Africa, which provides a recognized professional qualification for supporting staff of Chartered Accountants.
Examinations for this qualification are held on the same day each year in centers throughout the region.
In May 2011 The Gambia Association of Accountancy ran a three-day "Train the trainer" seminar on International Financial Reporting Standards (IFRS) for Small and Medium Enterprises (SMEs) for trainers from The Gambia, Ghana, Sierra Leone, Liberia and Cameroon.
The seminar was supported by the World Bank under the umbrella of ABWA.

In May 2011 Major General Sebastian Achulike Owuama (retired), the 46th President of ICAN and the 16th President of ABWA, was elected President of the newly created Pan-African Federation of Accountants (PAFA), or Fédération Panafricaine des Experts-Comptables (FEPEC).
He was elected during the inaugural meeting of PAFA in Dakar, Senegal.

Membership

As of 2011, ABWA had the following members:

As of March 2011, the Association of National Accountants of Nigeria (ANAN) had applied to become a member of ABWA.

References

West Africa
Organizations established in 1982
Professional associations based in Nigeria
1982 establishments in Nigeria
International organizations based in Africa